Madre Madison Harper (born October 13, 1997) is an American football cornerback for the Pittsburgh Steelers of the National Football League (NFL). He was signed by the Las Vegas Raiders as an undrafted free agent in 2020 following his college football career with the Southern Illinois Salukis.

Professional career

Las Vegas Raiders
Harper signed with the Las Vegas Raiders as an undrafted free agent following the 2020 NFL Draft on May 5, 2020. He was waived during final roster cuts on September 5, 2020, and signed to the team's practice squad the next day. He was elevated to the active roster on September 26 for the team's week 3 game against the New England Patriots, but was ruled inactive for the game, and reverted to the practice squad on September 28. He terminated his practice squad contract with the Raiders on September 29 in order to sign with the New York Giants.

New York Giants
Harper signed to the New York Giants' active roster on October 1, 2020. On December 11, 2020, Harper was placed on injured reserve. On January 2, 2021, Harper was activated off of injured reserve.He was released on August 31  He signed a contract extension with the Giants on January 4, 2021.

On August 31, 2021, Harper was waived by the Giants.

Las Vegas Raiders (second stint)
On September 2, 2021, Harper was signed to the Las Vegas Raiders practice squad. He was released on September 15.

Carolina Panthers
On September 28, 2021, Harper was signed to the Carolina Panthers practice squad. He signed a reserve/future contract with the Panthers on January 10, 2022.

On August 30, 2022, Harper was waived by the Panthers and signed to the practice squad the next day.

Pittsburgh Steelers
On January 11, 2023, Harper signed a reserve/future contract with the Pittsburgh Steelers.

References

External links
New York Giants bio
Southern Illinois Salukis football bio

1997 births
Living people
African-American players of American football
American football cornerbacks
Carolina Panthers players
Las Vegas Raiders players
New York Giants players
Oklahoma State Cowboys football players
People from Irving, Texas
Players of American football from Texas
Southern Illinois Salukis football players
Sportspeople from the Dallas–Fort Worth metroplex
21st-century African-American sportspeople
Pittsburgh Steelers players